James Wadsworth (July 8, 1730 – September 22, 1816) was an American lawyer from Durham, Connecticut. Initially a brigadier general of the Connecticut militia during the Revolutionary War, after the death of David Wooster in 1777 he became the major general of militia and the second-highest ranked militia officer in the state. He served as a delegate to the Continental Congress in 1784.

References

External links
Wadsworth's biography at U.S. Congress

1730 births
1816 deaths
Connecticut militiamen in the American Revolution
Continental Congressmen from Connecticut
18th-century American politicians
Militia generals in the American Revolution
Speakers of the Connecticut House of Representatives
Military personnel from Connecticut
Wadsworth family